Gephyroglanis is a genus of claroteid catfishes native to Africa.

Species 
There are currently three recognized species in this genus:
 Gephyroglanis congicus Boulenger, 1899
 Gephyroglanis gymnorhynchus Pappenheim, 1914
 Gephyroglanis habereri Steindachner, 1912

References

Claroteidae

Catfish genera
Freshwater fish genera
Taxa named by George Albert Boulenger